Aeoloplides chenopodii, the Colorado plateaus saltbush grasshopper, is a species of spur-throated grasshopper in the family Acrididae. It is found in North America.

Subspecies
These two subspecies belong to the species Aeoloplides chenopodii:
 Aeoloplides chenopodii arcuatus (Rehn, 1902) i c g
 Aeoloplides chenopodii chenopodii (Bruner, 1894) i c g
Data sources: i = ITIS, c = Catalogue of Life, g = GBIF, b = Bugguide.net

References

External links

 

Melanoplinae
Articles created by Qbugbot
Insects described in 1894